Bewdley is a compact rural community in the township municipality of Hamilton, Northumberland County, Ontario, Canada, with a population of about 650 people. The community was founded by William Bancks, whose ancestral home was Bewdley in England.

History
The area was used for habitation before this by native settlers. The first land grant was in 1794 to Nellie Grant, the daughter of a colonial administrator. The early local name for Bewdley was Black's Landing, taken from a tavern in the area. Early on, there were sawmills which drove settlement in the area.

William Bancks came to the area in 1833 and tried to organize the creation of a gentlemen's colony and a sawmill. The town is known for its monument to Joseph M. Scriven, who preached upon the village streets around the 1860s.

Recreation
The tourist and fishing industries have helped the Bewdley of today to be known as an enjoyable vacation spot on Rice Lake.

Economy
The post office on Rice Lake services locals with lock boxes and one rural route.

References

Communities in Northumberland County, Ontario